The 1932 Michigan State Spartans football team represented Michigan State College as an independent during the 1932 college football season. In their fourth and final season under head coach Jim Crowley, the Spartans compiled a 7–1 record. The team's only loss came in their annual rivalry game with Michigan by a 26 to 0 score. In inter-sectional play, the team defeated Fordham (19-13), Syracuse (27-13), and South Dakota (20-6).

Quarterback Bob Monnett was selected by the Newspaper Enterprise Association (NEA) as a second-team player on the 1932 College Football All-America Team.

Schedule

Game summaries

Michigan

On October 1, 1932, the Spartans played Michigan in Ann Arbor. Michigan won the game, 26–0. Fullback John Regeczi ran for a touchdown in the first quarter following a long drive. Additional touchdowns were scored by Stanley Fay, John Heston, and Herman Everhardus. Quarterback Harry Newman had a 35-yard punt return and successfully kicked two point after touchdown (PAT) attempts.

References

Michigan State
Michigan State Spartans football seasons
Michigan State Spartans football